The Cuanza Norte Province is province of Angola. N'dalatando is the capital and the province has an area of 24,110 km² and a population of 443,386. Manuel Pedro Pacavira was born here and is a former provincial governor. The 1,400 meter long Capanda Dam is located in this province. Cuanza Norte lies on the northern bank of the Cuanza River. It had been a territory of Ngola Kingdom. In 1914, Norton de Matos created District of Cuanza which was divided into Cuanza Norte and Cuanza Sul Provinces in 1917.

It was badly affected during the Angolan Civil War. It has many mines left over from the Civil War and contracts to clear them were given to several organisations. During the civil war, the insurgents made the province part of the central zone. On 5 April 2001, National Union for the Total Independence of Angola members attacked Samba Caju and killed 120 FAA members. The province's military commander, General Recordacao was also killed in the attack.

The most spoken languages are Kimbundu. Mbundu people inhabit the province.  Sugarcane and coffee are the most important agricultural crops. Their production is favoured by the tropical humid climate of the province.

Municipalities 
The province of Cuanza Norte contains ten municipalities:

Some sources show the following three municipalities in Bengo Province:

While others list those three in Cuanza Norte (Kwanza Norte) Province.

Communes 
The province of Cuanza Norte contains the following communes; sorted by their respective municipalities:

 Ambaca Municipality: – Bindo, Camabatela, Luinga, Maúa, Tango
 Banga Municipality: – Aldeia Nova, Banga, Caculo Cabaça, Cariamba
 Bolongongo Municipality: – Bolongongo, Quiquiemba, Terreiro
 Cambambe Municipality: – Danje-ia-Menha, Dondo, Massangano, São Pedro da Kilemba, Zenza do Itombe
 Cazengo Municipality: – Canhoca, N'dalatando
 Golungo Alto Municipality: – Cambondo, Cêrca, Golungo Alto, Kiluanje
 N'Gonguembo Municipality: – Camame, Cavunga, Quilombo dos Dembos (Ngonguembo)
 Licucala Municipality: – Lukala, Quiangombe
 Quiculungo Municipality: – Quiculungo
 Samba Cajú Municipality: – Samba Cajú, Samba Lucala
 Bula-Atumba Municipality: – Bula-Atumba, Quiage (Kiaje)
 Dembos Municipality: – Paredes, Piri, Quibaxe, São José das Matas
 Pango-Aluquém Municipality: – Cazuangongo (Kazua), Pango-Aluquém

List of governors of Cuanza Norte

See also
Church of Nossa Senhora da Victoria

References

Citations

Bibliography

External links 
 Official website of province governor
 Information on this province at the Angolan ministry for territorial administration
 Information on this province at Info Angola
 US government statistics from 1988
 Angolan embassy in the UK official population statistics
 Angola.org.uk
 Province geographical info at geoview.info

 
Provinces of Angola